Julien Barbier was a French architect who specialized in religious architecture.

Work 
Notable works include:
 Sacré-Cœur Church, Dijon,

 Saint-Maurice de Bécon-les-Bruyères Church, Courbevoie (1907),

 Saint-Rémi de Limé Church, Aisne (1929) (made a monument historique).

 Sainte-Germaine Parish Church, Cachan (1932),

 Chapel of the Grand Saint-Mars Château, Chalo-Saint-Mars (1898), with Eugène Méhu (made a monument historique).

 War Memorial, La Garenne-Colombes (1913),
 The Lamartine School Complex, Gentilly (1922), with Georges Morice,
 The Notre-Dame-des-Otages Church, Paris,

 The Sainte-Jeanne-de-Chantal Church, Paris.

References

External links 
 Page on Julien Barbier (Fr.)

1869 births
1940 deaths
French architects